Peter Herzog (born 1 August 1987) is an Austrian long-distance runner.

In 2018, he competed in the men's half marathon at the 2018 IAAF World Half Marathon Championships held in Valencia, Spain. He finished in 53rd place. In the same year, he also competed in the men's marathon at the 2018 European Athletics Championships held in Berlin, Germany. He finished in 10th place with a personal best of 2:15:29. He won the bronze medal in the 2018 European Marathon Cup. He participated in the 2020 Olympics.

At London Marathon 2020 Herzog improved the Austrian national marathon record by finishing in 2:10:06 (previous: Lemawork Ketema, 2:10:44, Vienna 2019).

References

External links 
 

Living people
1987 births
Place of birth missing (living people)
Austrian male long-distance runners
Austrian male marathon runners
Athletes (track and field) at the 2020 Summer Olympics
Olympic athletes of Austria
Olympic male marathon runners